("Michael the German") is a figure representing the national character of the German people, rather as John Bull represents the English. He originated in the first half of the 19th century.

Overview 
Michel differs from figures that serve as personifications of the nation itself, as Germania did the German nation and Marianne the French, in that he represents the German people. He is usually depicted wearing a nightcap and nightgown, sometimes in the colors of the German flag, and represents the Germans' conception of themselves, especially in his easy-going nature and Everyman appearance. In any event, the nightgown and the night cap, which have been present in all pictorial representations of the German Michelthe first ones dating from the first half of the nineteenth centuryare also interpreted in a way that the German Michel is, in fact, a rather naive and gullible person, not prone, for example, to question the authority of the government. On the contrary, he prefers a decent, plain and quiet lifestyle.

Over the centuries, the character traits attributed to the German Michel were subject to some change. The British historian Eric Hobsbawm wrote the most notable aspect of Deutscher Michel as portrayed in Imperial Germany was that:
 The central problem of creating a national identity in the newly unified German Reich was all of the various German states had their own histories and traditions, none of which could be used as a symbol to appeal to everybody, leading to a situation where Hobsbawm noted:

In this regard, Deutscher Michel was very different from Marianne who was defined in a more positive way as a symbol of the republic and its values.

A typical cartoon featuring Deutscher Michel occurred in the May 1914 edition of the magazine Kladderadatsch where Deutscher Michel is working happily in his garden with a seductive and voluptuous Marianne on one side and a brutish muzhik (Russian peasant) on the other; the message of the cartoon was that France should not be allied to Russia, and would be better off allied to Germany, since Deutscher Michel with his well tended garden is clearly a better potential husband than the vodka-drinking muzhik whose garden is a disorderly disaster. To further reinforce the point, Deutscher Michel is pouring cold water on two chickens in a cage whose initials stand for Alsace-Lorraine, meaning that Germany can pour cold water on France's hopes of taking back Alsace-Lorraine anytime it wants. The caption has Deutscher Michel saying that he wants peace, but if his neighbors want war, then they will get it, reflecting the fact that Michel for all his good-natured and easy-going ways, is utterly ferocious when angered.

In German, Michel is also the short form of Michael, though quite rare today.

See also 
 Germania, historic national personification of Germany
 Flag and Coat of Arms of Germany
 Berolina, personification of Berlin
 Hammonia, personification of Hamburg
 Czech Vasek, Czech national personification created in opposition to German Michl

References

Sources 
 
 

German culture
Fictional German people